The Strawberry Line is a  length of  gauge railway inside Avon Valley Country Park (near Keynsham). It was Britain's only commercial ground-level  railway until it became a 7.5inch gage in 2020 but it is a dual gauge so the 5in remains. As a conventional ridable miniature railway it provides train rides for visitors to the park now included in the price of admission since it was taken over by the park in 2018. It now runs mainly 1 train, a large electric mock steam train although they do own a small electric one, a traditional steam and a big petrol train. Since the refurbishment it is now driven by the team of park rangers who work there

History
The railway was started at the Avon Valley Country Park in May 1999, with the first trains running on a  demonstration track.  A trackbed was roughed out in June and the first services ran on the new  track in August 1999. A  tunnel was added in 2003.
since the parks takeover in 2018 it was converted to a dual gauge 5 inch and 7.5inch. since the refurbishment, the tunnel is now no longer used on the circuit and is now used as a storage tunnel but there are talks of using the old 5inch track and doing tunnel runs for a small extra cost as well as running the free main track so that the railway can generate some independent income for upkeep and repairs to track and trains.

The railway
An area is set aside for the coaling and preparation of steam locomotives, including a fire-dropping pit.

The whole railway was resignalled  by 2006  with track circuits replacing the treadle-operated signalling system. The signalling recreates the prototypical railway operational scenario, with signals not clearing unless the section ahead, or the intersecting line, is clear.

References

External links

 Official Website
 Strawberry Line Miniature Railway Pictures (Weston super Mare Railway Society)

Miniature railways in the United Kingdom
Heritage railways in Somerset